Parang Latok (which is also known as Latok, Latok Buku or Parang Pathi) is a sword from Kalimantan, Indonesia, that also functions as a machete.

Its used for both timber felling, agricultural activities and warfare is characterised by the noticeable bent at an obtuse angle from one-third of its length starting from the pommel. This parang features a single-edge blade that is heavier and wider towards the point of the blade. The handle of the Parang Latok is made of wood without a guard and often tied securely with rattan at its grip. It is carried in a long, two-piece wooden sheath to properly hold the blade.

In the past, the Parang Latok is also used for executing condemned criminals, and the decapitation is normally achieved with a single blow. This parang is used two-handedly, with one hand holding the hilt and the other holding the blade's shoulder, enabling its user to strike downwards.

A smaller version of the Parang Latok is called the Buko, while another variant of the Parang Latok is known as the Sadap.

See also 

 Pandat

References 

Blade weapons
Weapons of Indonesia
Weapons of Malaysia